Peter Guggi (born September 25, 1967) is a retired Austrian football player. He played for Rapid Vienna in the 1996 UEFA Cup Winners' Cup Final.

External links
 

1967 births
Living people
Austrian expatriate footballers
Austrian footballers
Expatriate footballers in Scotland
Grazer AK players
Hibernian F.C. players
LASK players
Scottish Football League players
SK Rapid Wien players
FC Admira Wacker Mödling players
Austrian Football Bundesliga players

Association football midfielders